Elena Fernández Gómez (8 February 1941 – 3 January 2021), known by the pen name Elena Santiago, was a Spanish writer of novels, short stories and children's literature.

Biography
Her mother "despite many busy hours, read very continuously, and that was a tireless source of wonders, reading and writing." Santiago then began teacher training and took Literature Studies, first in León and then in Madrid, where she "changed her life". From the beginning she wanted to dedicate herself to writing, painting, playing the piano, studying languages, and letters. Santiago began publishing in her teens.

Her first two publications, selected by  magazine, were short stories entitled "" and "". From then, she continued to publish poetry, short stories, poetic prose, novels, and children's literature.

Santiago began receiving awards with her first publications in 1973. In her literary career she alternated novels with short stories, dedicating periods to the latter genre "out of the need to tell stories." Some of her short stories were collected under the title  in 2004.

She spent eight years to 2009 writing children's literature, during which period she experienced health and family problems. In 2009 she wrote .

She died at the age of 79 on 3 January 2021 in Valladolid, Spain.

Study of her literary work
Santiago's work has been studied in the context of the Congress of Contemporary Literature and as a 20th-century women novelist. It is the subject of the doctoral thesis by Muriel Taján, with the title  (2009). Taján also authored the prologue to the novel , which Santiago published in 2015, after a gap of six years.

Collective works
The 2013 edition was a tribute to Santiago in which her daughter and granddaughter, who is the author of one of the stories, participated. Another project on which Santiago collaborated compiles traditional folktales narrated by voices of Castile and León. She also contributed to the collective book  (2005), contains the story "?", a work in solidarity with immigrants in which she advocates the need to move towards a multicultural society.

Works
  (1976)
  (1977), short stories
  (1979)
  (1980)
  (1980)
  (1983)
  (1985)
  (1986), short stories
  (1988)
  (1994)
  (1997)
  (1997)
  (1998)
  (1998), short stories
  (2001)
  (2003), short stories
  (2003), children's literature
  (2004)
  (2009)
  (2015)
  (2018), children's literature
  (2019)

Awards and recognitions
 1973: City of León Award
 1974: Ignacio Aldecoa Award (4th place)
 1974: City of San Sebastián Award
 1975: Ignacio Aldecoa Award (1st place)
 1976: Lena Award
 1976: City of Irún Award
 1977: Jauja Award
 1977:  Award
 1979:  Award
 1980:  Award
 1980: Miguel Delibes Narrative Award
 1981: City of Barbastro Award
 1981:  and  Awards
 1983: Felipe Trigo Award
 1985:  Award
 1991: A plaza named for her in Veguellina de Órbigo
 1998: Rosa Chacel Award
 1999: Literary Career Award, from the 
 2002: 
 2003: Named Favorite Daughter of Veguellina de Órbigo

References

External links
 

1941 births
2021 deaths
20th-century Spanish women writers
21st-century Spanish women writers
People from the Province of León
Spanish children's writers
Spanish women children's writers
Spanish novelists
Spanish women novelists
Spanish women short story writers
Spanish short story writers